2018 Jalalabad attack may refer to:

2018 Save the Children Jalalabad attack in January
July 2018 Jalalabad suicide bombing
September 2018 Jalalabad suicide bombing